Visa requirements for Kiribati citizens are administrative entry restrictions by the authorities of other states placed on citizens of Kiribati. As of 2 July 2019, Kiribati citizens had visa-free or visa on arrival access to 121 countries and territories, ranking the Kiribati passport 48th in terms of travel freedom according to the Henley Passport Index.

Kiribati signed a mutual visa waiver agreement with Schengen Area countries on 24 June 2016.

Visa requirements map

Visa requirements

Dependent, Disputed, or Restricted territories
Unrecognized or partially recognized countries

Dependent and autonomous territories

See also 

Visa policy of Kiribati

References and Notes
References

Notes

Kiribati
Foreign relations of Kiribati